Garrett Stutz (born February 10, 1990) is an American professional basketball player. He played college basketball at Wichita State.

College career
Stutz, a 7'0" center from Kansas City, Missouri, came to Wichita State in 2008 at a slight 215 pounds. Over the course of his four-year career with the Shockers, he gained 40 pounds and improved from a role player to one of the top players in the Missouri Valley Conference (MVC).  In his senior season, Stutz averaged 13.3 points and 8.0 rebounds per game and was named first-team All-MVC.

Professional career
Following the close of his college career, Stutz was not selected in the 2012 NBA draft.  He began his professional career with Anyang KGC in South Korea, before returning to the United States to play for the Maine Red Claws of the NBA Development League.  He averaged 5.5 points and 4.3 rebounds with the Red Claws in the 2012–13 season.  After averaging 12.6 points and 7.1 rebounds for Energa Czarni Słupsk of the Polish League in 2013–14, Stutz signed with ČEZ Nymburk for the 2014–15 season.

On June 12, 2015, Stutz signed with Tsmoki-Minsk of Belarus.

References

External links
 ČEZ Nymburk profile
 Eurocup profile
 Wichita State Shockers bio

1990 births
Living people
American expatriate basketball people in Belarus
American expatriate basketball people in Japan
American expatriate basketball people in Poland
American expatriate basketball people in South Korea
American expatriate basketball people in Spain
American expatriate basketball people in the Czech Republic
American men's basketball players
Anyang KGC players
Basketball players from Kansas City, Missouri
BC Tsmoki-Minsk players
Centers (basketball)
Basketball Nymburk players
Gunma Crane Thunders players
Hiroshima Dragonflies players
Joventut Badalona players
Liga ACB players
Maine Red Claws players
Osaka Evessa players
Saga Ballooners players
Shimane Susanoo Magic players
Toyotsu Fighting Eagles Nagoya players
Wichita State Shockers men's basketball players